The 1976–77 season was the forth season of the Takht Jamshid Cup of Iranian football. The competition was won by PAS Football Club of Tehran.

Results

Top goalscorers

References 
Pars sport

Takht Jamshid Cup
Iran
1976–77 in Iranian football